A Very Long Engagement ("A long Sunday of engagement") is a 2004 French-American romantic war drama film, co-written and directed by Jean-Pierre Jeunet and starring Audrey Tautou, Gaspard Ulliel and Marion Cotillard. It is a fictional tale about a young woman's desperate search for her fiancé who might have been killed during World War I. It was based on the 1991 novel of the same name by Sébastien Japrisot.

The film was nominated for the Academy Awards for Best Art Direction and Best Cinematography at the 77th Academy Awards. Marion Cotillard won the César Award for Best Supporting Actress for her performance, and Gaspard Ulliel won the César Award for Most Promising Actor.

Plot
Five French soldiers are convicted of self-mutilation in order to escape military service during World War I. They are condemned to face near-certain death in no man's land between the French and German trench lines. It appears that all of them were killed in a subsequent battle, but Mathilde, the fiancée of one of the soldiers, refuses to give up hope and begins to uncover clues as to what actually took place on the battlefield. She is all the while driven by the constant reminder of what her fiancé had carved into one of the bells of the church near their home, MMM for Manech Aime Mathilde (Manech Loves Mathilde; a pun on the French word aime, which is pronounced like the letter "M". In the English-language version, this is changed to "Manech's Marrying Mathilde").

Along the way, she discovers the brutally corrupt system used by the French government to deal with those who tried to escape the front. She also discovers the stories of the other men who were sentenced to no man's land as a punishment. She, with the help of a private investigator, Germain Pire, attempts to find out what happened to her fiancé. The story is told both from the point of view of the fiancée in Paris and the French countryside—mostly Brittany—of the 1920s, and through flashbacks to the battlefield.

Eventually, Mathilde finds out her fiancé is alive, but he suffers from amnesia. Seeing Mathilde, Manech seems to be oblivious of her. At this, Mathilde sits on the garden chair silently watching Manech with tears in her eyes and a smile on her lips.

Cast

Production and release
A Very Long Engagement was filmed entirely in France over an 18-month period, with about 30 French actors, approximately 500 French technicians and more than 2,000 French extras. Right before the film's New York City and Hollywood debut, the film's production company ("2003 Productions"), which is one-third owned by Warner Brothers and two-thirds owned by Warner France, was ruled an American production company by a French court, denying the studio $4.8 million in government incentives,. The ruling is consistent with the fact that Warner France is owned by Warner Spain, which is owned by Warner Nederland, itself a subsidiary of Warner Brothers.

Warner Independent released the film theatrically in the US, followed by VHS and DVD release on July 12, 2005. It was Warner Independent's final VHS release. The only Blu-ray to date is a region B disc from Warner Home Video in France.

In the film, Manech and Mathilde are from Brittany, whereas in the novel, they are from Capbreton, in the Landes department of southwest France.

Reception

Critical response
The film received generally positive reviews from critics. On Rotten Tomatoes, 78% of critics gave the film positive reviews, based on 148 reviews, and an average rating of 7.40/10. The website's critical consensus states, "A well-crafted and visually arresting drama with a touch of whimsy". On Metacritic the film has a weighted average score of 76 out of 100, based on reviews from 39 critics, indicating "generally favorable reviews". The film had a production budget of $56.6 million USD and earned $69.4 million in theaters worldwide.

Peter Travers of Rolling Stone praised "miracle worker" Jean-Pierre Jeunet and called the film "an emotional powerhouse".

Roger Ebert of the Chicago Sun-Times wrote: "Jeunet brings everything together—his joyously poetic style, the lovable Tautou, a good story worth the telling—into a film that is a series of pleasures stumbling over one another in their haste to delight us."

Manohla Dargis of The New York Times, gave a negative review on this film stating that "Mr. Jeunet shows no interest in animating the characters in his dollhouse world".

Awards
The film received Academy Award nominations for Best Art Direction and Best Cinematography at the 77th Oscars, losing both to The Aviator. It was not selected as the French submission for the Academy Award for Best Foreign Language Film, in favor of The Chorus. Marion Cotillard won the César Award for Best Supporting Actress for her performance, while Audrey Tautou was nominated for Best Actress.

 30th César Awards (France)
 Won: Best Supporting Actress (Marion Cotillard)
 Won: Best Cinematography (Bruno Delbonnel)
 Won: Best Costume Design (Madeline Fontaine)
 Won: Best Production Design (Aline Bonetto)
 Won: Most Promising Actor (Gaspard Ulliel)
 Nominated: Best Actress (Audrey Tautou)
 Nominated: Best Director (Jean-Pierre Jeunet)
 Nominated: Best Editing (Hervé Schneid)
 Nominated: Best Film
 Nominated: Best Music (Angelo Badalamenti)
 Nominated: Best Sound (Vincent Arnardi, Gérard Hardy and Jean Umansky)
 Nominated: Best Writing (Jean-Pierre Jeunet and Guillaume Laurant)
 London's Favourite French Film 2006 (United Kingdom)
 Won: Best Film
 77th Academy Awards (USA)
 Nominated: Best Art Direction (Aline Bonetto)
 Nominated: Best Cinematography (Bruno Delbonnel)

 BAFTA Awards (UK)
 Nominated: BAFTA Award for Best Film Not in the English Language
 10th Critics' Choice Awards (USA)
 Nominated: Best Foreign-Language Film
 Boston Society of Film Critics Awards
 Runner-up: Best Foreign Language Film
 Chicago Film Critics Association (USA)
 Won: Best Foreign Language Film
 Dallas-Fort Worth Film Critics Association (USA)
 Won: Best Foreign Language Film
 Placed 9th: Top 10 Films
 Florida Film Critics Circle (USA)
 Won: Best Foreign Film
 Kansas City Film Critics Circle Awards (USA)
 Won: Best Foreign Language Film
 Golden Globe Awards (USA)
 Nominated: Best Foreign Language Film

See also
 List of World War I films

References

External links
  
 
 
 

2004 films
2000s French-language films
French war drama films
French World War I films
Films shot in Haute-Corse
2000s war drama films
Anti-war films about World War I
Edgar Award-winning works
Films based on French novels
Films based on military novels
Films directed by Jean-Pierre Jeunet
Films featuring a Best Supporting Actress César Award-winning performance
Films whose director won the Best Director Lumières Award
France in World War I
2000s historical romance films
War romance films
Warner Independent Pictures films
Western Front (World War I) films
Novels set during World War I
Films set in France
Films set in Corsica
Films shot in France
Films shot in Corsica
Films scored by Angelo Badalamenti
Films based on works by Sébastien Japrisot
French historical romance films
2004 drama films
American war drama films
2000s American films
2000s French films